Discorbacea, Discorboidea in recent taxonomies, is a superfamily of  foraminifera, (testate protists), with a range extending from the Middle Triassic to the present, characterized by chambers arranged in a low trochspiral; an umbilical or interiomarginal aperture, with or without supplementary apertures; and a wall structure that is optically radial.

Eight families are currently recognized, further characterized here in.

 Discorbidae – Discorbacea in which each chamber is partly divided by an imperforate wall and the umbilical area partly is covered by  chamber extensions. Discorbis, Neoeponides
 Bagginidae – Discorbacea with an overall finely perforate test, but imperforate in a part of ventral side Baggina,  Cancris
 Eponididae – in which the aperture is interiomarginal and slitlike (or a narrow arch) or areal and cribrate. Eponides,  Joanella, Paumotua, Poroeponides
 Heleninidae – in which the primary aperture is interiomarginal and secondary apertures are sutural Helenina
 MIsissippinidae – have distinct, translucent or opaque bands near the periphery on one or both sides; Mississippina, Stomatorbina
 Pegidiidae – in which coiling is a modified trochospiral, with resorbed early chambers and apertures are open ends of tubes on the ventral side Pegidia
 Rotalinidae – have simple chamber interiors, an umbilicus partly covered by chamber extensions or closed, and  an  aperture that is a low interiomarginal arch. Gavellinopsis, Nevconorbina, Rosalina
 Sphaeroidinidae – Discorbacea with  strongly overlapping chambers, arranged trochospirally or in different planes; and single slitlike or multiple apertures. Sphaeroidina

Two other families were included, the Asterigerinidae and Epistomariidae, which have been removed to the Asterigerinacea.  Some now included families such as the Bagginidae were once defined as a subfamily, the Bagginindae, based on the genus Baggina, in the Discorbidae. As a result the discorbid subfamily Discorbine became the present Discorbidae. The Pegidiidae, originally the rotaliitid subfamily Pegidiinae was removed from the Rotaliacea and added to the Discorbacea as a family. Helenina, a genus in the Discorbinae, became the type for its own family, the Heleninidae. Finally the Eponididae was once included in the Orbitoidacea before being made part of the Discorbacea.

References

Foraminifera superfamilies
Rotaliida